Lipovšica (in older sources also Lipovščica) is a settlement halfway between Sodražica and Ribnica in southern Slovenia. The area is part of the traditional region of Lower Carniola and is now included in the Southeast Slovenia Statistical Region.

References

External links

Lipovšica on Geopedia

Populated places in the Municipality of Sodražica